Vadim Aleksandrovich Dombrovskiy (born 21 May 1958) is a Soviet swimmer who won a bronze medal in the 100 m butterfly at the 1981 European Aquatics Championships. In 1980, he set a European record in the same event. During his career he won four national titles, in the 100 m butterfly (1975, 1980, 1981) and 4×100 m medley (1982).

References

1958 births
Living people
Ukrainian male swimmers
Male butterfly swimmers
Soviet male swimmers
European Aquatics Championships medalists in swimming
Sportspeople from Kyiv
National University of Ukraine on Physical Education and Sport alumni